On 8 February 2023, Volodymyr Zelenskyy, the president of Ukraine, visited the United Kingdom. During his trip, Zelenskyy met Rishi Sunak, the prime minister of the United Kingdom. He also addressed Members of Parliament from Westminster Hall in the Houses of Parliament and had an audience with King Charles III. It was Zelenskyy's second trip outside Ukraine since the beginning of the Russian invasion of Ukraine, after his December 2022 visit to the United States.

Background
On 24 February 2022, Russia invaded Ukraine in a major escalation of the Russo-Ukrainian War that began in 2014. Throughout the war, a number of states have provided military and humanitarian aid to Ukraine, including the United Kingdom; in 2022, the UK government spent  on military aid for Ukraine.

Visit to the United Kingdom

Meeting with Rishi Sunak
Zelenskyy flew from Rzeszów–Jasionka Airport in Poland to London Stansted Airport aboard an RAF C-17 (serial number ZZ178). He was greeted on the tarmac at Stansted by the prime minister of the United Kingdom, Rishi Sunak, who invited Zelenskyy to 10 Downing Street.

Addressing Parliament
Zelenskyy addressed Members of Parliament from Westminster Hall in the Houses of Parliament, where he received a standing ovation.

Audience with Charles III
Zelenskyy had an audience with Charles III.

Troops visit
Zelenskyy visited Ukrainian troops being trained at Lulworth Camp in Dorset.

Gallery

See also
 2023 visit by Joe Biden to Ukraine

References

2023 in international relations
2023 in British politics
2023 in London
February 2023 events in the United Kingdom
Events affected by the 2022 Russian invasion of Ukraine
State visits by Ukrainian leaders
Diplomatic visits
United Kingdom
Rishi Sunak
Ukraine–United Kingdom relations